The F.W. Woolworth Building is a historic department store building located in Kansas City, Missouri that served as a retail location for the F. W. Woolworth Company from 1928 until 1964. The one-story building includes a balustrade parapet and Moderne storefront.

See also
 National Register of Historic Places listings in Jackson County, Missouri: Downtown Kansas City

References
NRHP Registration Form
National Register of Historic Places

Commercial buildings completed in 1928
Economy of Kansas City, Missouri
Buildings and structures in Kansas City, Missouri
Department stores on the National Register of Historic Places
F. W. Woolworth Company buildings and structures
Commercial buildings on the National Register of Historic Places in Missouri
1928 establishments in Missouri
National Register of Historic Places in Kansas City, Missouri